Salem Methodist Episcopal Church, also known as Salem United Methodist Church, is a historic United Methodist church in Helt Township, Vermillion County, Indiana. The church was built in 1878 to house Vermillion County's first Methodist congregation, which was established in the 1820s. The brick church was designed in the Gothic Revival style. The front of the church features a brick tower topped with a truncated roof and a bell tower. The church's windows and front entrance have a pointed arch design.

The church was added to the National Register of Historic Places on February 22, 1979.

References

Churches on the National Register of Historic Places in Indiana
Gothic Revival church buildings in Indiana
Churches completed in 1878
Buildings and structures in Vermillion County, Indiana
National Register of Historic Places in Vermillion County, Indiana
1878 establishments in Indiana